John Bidwell (August 5, 1819 – April 4, 1900), known in Spanish as Don Juan Bidwell, was a Californian pioneer, politician, and soldier. Bidwell is known as the founder the city of Chico, California.

Born in New York, he emigrated at the age of 22 to Alta California (then a part of Mexico) as part of the Bartleson–Bidwell Party, one of the first expeditions of American emigrants along the California Trail. In California, he became a Mexican citizen and a prominent landowner, receiving multiple rancho grants from the governors of Alta California. Following the U.S. Conquest of California, Bidwell went on to serve in the California Senate and then in the U.S. House of Representatives.

Biography
Bidwell was born in 1819 in Chautauqua County, New York. His Bidwell ancestors immigrated to North America in the colonial era.  His family moved to Erie, Pennsylvania, in 1829, and then to Ashtabula County, Ohio, in 1831. At age 17, he attended and shortly thereafter became principal of Kingsville Academy.

In 1841, at the age of 22, Bidwell became one of the first emigrants on the California Trail. John Sutter employed Bidwell as his business manager shortly after the younger man reached California. In October 1844, Bidwell went with Sutter to Monterey, where the two learned of an insurrection by leader José Castro and ex-governor Juan Bautista Alvarado. In 1845, Bidwell and Sutter joined Governor Manuel Micheltorena and a group of Americans and Indians to fight the insurrectionists, pursuing them to Cahuenga. Micheltorena, Sutter, and Bidwell were imprisoned, and the latter two were shortly thereafter released.

Upon release, Bidwell headed north through Placerita Canyon, saw the mining operations, and was determined to search for gold on his way to Sutter's Fort, where he met James W. Marshall. Shortly after Marshall's discovery of gold at Sutter's Mill, Bidwell also discovered gold on the Feather River, establishing a productive claim at Bidwell Bar in advance of the California Gold Rush. Bidwell obtained the four square-league Rancho Los Ulpinos land grant after being naturalized as a Mexican citizen in 1844, and the two square-league Rancho Colus grant on the Sacramento River in 1845. He later sold the latter grant and bought Rancho Arroyo Chico on Chico Creek to establish a ranch and farm.

Bidwell attained the rank of major while fighting in the Mexican–American War. He was elected to  the California Senate in 1849. He supervised conducting the federal census of California in 1850 and 1860, under national direction by Joseph C. G. Kennedy.
Bidwell served as a delegate to the 1860 national convention of the U.S. Democratic Party. He was appointed brigadier general of the California Militia in 1863. After switching parties, he was a delegate to the national convention of the Republican Party in 1864. That year he was elected to the U.S. House of Representatives, serving as a Republican representative for California from 1865 to 1867.

In 1865, General Bidwell backed a petition from settlers at Red Bluff, California to protect Red Bluff's trail to the Owyhee Mines of Idaho.  The United States Army commissioned seven forts for this purpose. One site was near Fandango Pass at the base of the Warner Mountains, in the north end of Surprise Valley. On June 10, 1865, what was named Fort Bidwell was ordered to be built there.  The fort was built amid escalating fighting with the Snake Indians of eastern Oregon and southern Idaho. It was a base for US Army operations in the Snake War, that lasted until 1868, and the later Modoc War.  Although traffic dwindled on the Red Bluff route once the Central Pacific Railroad extended into Nevada in 1868, the Army staffed Fort Bidwell until 1890 to quell various uprisings and disturbances.  A Paiute reservation and small community maintain the name Fort Bidwell.

In 1868 Bidwell was about 49 when he married Annie Kennedy, whom he had courted for years. She was 20 years younger and a daughter of Joseph C. G. Kennedy. Her father was socially prominent, a high-ranking Washington official who supervised the U.S. Census Bureau. Bidwell had met him while working on the California census. The senior Kennedy was active in the U.S. Whig party. Annie Kennedy was deeply religious, joining the Presbyterian Church, and committed to a number of moral and social causes. Kennedy Bidwell was very active in the suffrage and prohibition movements.

The couple married April 16, 1868 in Washington, D.C. with President Andrew Johnson and future president Ulysses S. Grant among the guests. After he returned with her to Chico, the Bidwells used their mansion extensively for entertainment of friends and official guests. Among them were President Rutherford B. Hayes, General William T. Sherman, Susan B. Anthony, Frances Willard, Governor Leland Stanford, John Muir, Joseph Dalton Hooker, and Asa Gray.

In 1875, Bidwell ran for Governor of California on the Anti-Monopoly Party ticket. As a strong advocate of the temperance movement, he was the Prohibition candidate for governor in 1880 and presided over the Prohibition Party state convention in 1888. In the 1892 presidential election, Bidwell was the candidate from Prohibition Party. The Bidwell/Cranfill ticket came in fourth place nationwide, receiving 271,058 votes, or 2.3%. It was the largest total vote and highest percentage of the vote received by any Prohibition Party national ticket.

John Bidwell's autobiography, Echoes of the Past, was published in 1900. The Bidwell Family Papers are held at the Bancroft Library. That same year, Bidwell died of natural causes on April 4, at the age of 80.

The actor Howard Negley (1898-1983) played Bidwell in the 1953 episode, "The Lady with the Blue Silk Umbrella" on the syndicated television anthology series, Death Valley Days, hosted by Stanley Andrews. In the story line, Helen Crosby (Kathleen Case) carries official California statehood papers in her umbrella to shield them from ruffians who want to destroy the documents. Rick Vallin played Lieutenant Bob Hastings.

Fraternal allegiance
 Bidwell was a Freemason for a time but left the group.  He said that allegiance to the fraternity "was pointless" in an October 17, 1867 letter to Annie Kennedy, whom he had been courting. His signature appears in the Book of By-Laws of the Chico-Leland Stanford Lodge #111 in Chico, California.

See also
 Bartleson–Bidwell Party
 California Republic
 Bidwell Mansion State Historic Park
 California Trail
 Michael Gillis
 Temperance movement

Citations

External links 
 Bigler Family collection, 1852–1918. Collection guide, California State Library, California History Room.
 "The First Emigrant Train to California" by John Bidwell
"Bidwell-Bartleson Trail Guide" by Roy D. Tea
Autobiography and Reminiscence of John Bidwell, San Francisco, 1904 [Transcription]. The Society of California Pioneers, via Calisphere.
Guide to the Bidwell Family Papers at The Bancroft Library

|-

|-

|-

1819 births
1900 deaths
19th-century American businesspeople
19th-century American politicians
Activists from California
Activists from New York (state)
American city founders
American conservationists
American explorers
American geologists
American gold prospectors
American hunters
19th-century American inventors
American male writers
American military personnel of the Mexican–American War
American mountain climbers
American naturalists
American people of the Bear Flag Revolt
American temperance activists
Anti-Monopoly Party politicians
Brigadier generals
California Democrats
California pioneers
California Prohibitionists
California state senators
Candidates in the 1892 United States presidential election
Explorers of California
History of the Sierra Nevada (United States)
Land owners from California
Naturalized citizens of Mexican California
People from Chico, California
People from Chautauqua County, New York
People of the Conquest of California
Prohibition Party (United States) presidential nominees
Republican Party members of the United States House of Representatives from California
Writers from California
Scientists from New York (state)